Methodist Episcopal Church is a historic Methodist Episcopal church located at Dryden in Tompkins County, New York. It is a -story frame church structure built in 1874 in the Romanesque Revival style.  It is located at the northeast corner of the "four corners" main intersection and, with its towering spire, serves as a focal point and community landmark.

It was listed on the National Register of Historic Places in 1984.

References

Churches on the National Register of Historic Places in New York (state)
Churches completed in 1874
19th-century Methodist church buildings in the United States
Romanesque Revival church buildings in New York (state)
Churches in Tompkins County, New York
Methodist churches in New York (state)
National Register of Historic Places in Tompkins County, New York